The 2022–23 season is the 139th season in the existence of Lincoln City F.C. and the club's fourth consecutive season in League One. In addition to the league, they will also compete in the 2022–23 FA Cup, the 2022–23 EFL Cup and the 2022–23 EFL Trophy.

Season overview

June
On 8 June, the club announced that LNER Stadium would have a new capacity of 10,780 following the purchase of the North-East Stand.

On 10 June, backroom staff David Kerslake and Richard O’Donnell were relieved of their duties as first-team assistant manager and first-team coach/senior professional development phase lead coach.

On 17 June, it was announced that Branston would be the front of shirt sponsors for the 2022–23 season.

On 18 June, the club announced their new home strip for the season.

On 24 June, the players reported back to first team training.

On 27 June, GBM took over the naming rights of what was the Lincolnshire Co-Op stand in the LNER Stadium.

On 27 June, Mike Garrity was appointed the new assistant head coach with Tom Shaw promoted to the first team coaching staff.

On 28 June, Rilmac Group took over the naming rights of what was the South Park stand in the LNER Stadium.

July
On 8 July, Scott Fry was appointed the new goalkeeper coach, replacing Steve Croudson who would join Grimsby Town.

On 28 July, Tom Hopper was confirmed as the new club captain.

On 28 July, the club announced their first-team squad numbers for the 2022–23 season.

August
On 1 August, Jordan McCann left his role as the clubs head of academy.

On 4 August, the club announced their new away strip for the season.

On 22 August, Chris Maguire was suspended by the club after being charged by The FA for misconduct under FA Rule E8.

September
On 8 September, the club announced their third strip for the season.

On 9 September, the fixture against Accrington Stanley was postponed following the passing of Queen Elizabeth II.

On 15 September, the fixture against Milton Keynes Dons was postponed following international call ups for both sides.

On 16 September, academy products Sean Roughan, Sam Long and Oisin Gallagher were called up for Republic of Ireland U21, Scotland U21 and Republic of Ireland U19 teams respectively.

On 22 September, Jon Pepper was appointed the new head of academy.

On 26 September, Carl Rushworth was called up to the England U21 squad for their upcoming fixture.

November
On 4 November, Sam Long was called up the Scotland U21 squad.

On 26 November, the Jabara family increased their stake in the club.

December
On 11 December, assistant manager Mike Garrity left the club to join Queens Park Rangers as the assistant manager to Neil Critchley.

On 15 December, the club announced a partnership with US soccer side San Diego Loyal SC.

On 23 December, Danny Butterfield was appointed the new assistant head coach.

January
On 18 January, the club published their annual accounts for the year ending June 2022.

On 18 January, planning permission was granted to develop the Stacey West stand.

February
On 2 February, head of performance Ross Burbeary left the club to join Derby County.

On 7 February, Harvey Jabara and Graham Rossini joined the clubs board.

On 15 February, Pablo Webster, Evan Mitz and Brian Anderson made a significant investment in Lincoln City.

March
On 15 March, Sean Roughan, Oisin Gallagher and Julian Donnery were called up for Republic of Ireland U21, Republic of Ireland U19 and Scotland U18 teams respectively.

On 17 March, Carl Rushworth was called up to the England U21 squad for their upcoming fixture.

Pre-season
The club confirmed three friendlies on 16 May 2022, with two matches scheduled at home against Blackburn Rovers and an as yet unannounced team alongside an away trip to Hartlepool United. On 30 May, the club announced an additional fixture against Gainsborough Trinity, a TBC Championship side behind-doors friendly, and another yet to be announced fixture as well as sending an XI to Sleaford Town, Lincoln United and Eastbourne Borough. The behind-the-doors friendly was confirmed to be Sheffield United on 1 June 2022. The remaining fixtures against Grimsby Town and West Ham United U23 were confirmed on 9 June 2022. The game against West Ham United U23s was later cancelled.

Competitions

League One

League table

Results summary

Results by round

Matches
On Thursday, 23 June 2022, the EFL League One fixtures were revealed.

FA Cup

Lincoln City were drawn away to Hendon or Chippenham Town in the first round on 17 October 2022. It was confirmed as Chippenham Town on 18 October.

EFL Cup

Lincoln were drawn against Doncaster Rovers in the first round on 23 June 2022. The second round draw took place on 10 August 2022 by Clinton Morrison and Michael Gray in which Lincoln were drawn against Barrow. The third round draw took place on 24 August 2022 and Lincoln City were drawn against Bristol City. A trip to Premier League Southampton was next in the fourth round.

EFL Trophy

The Imps were drawn into Group E of the Northern section alongside Doncaster Rover, Barnsley and a TBC invited club. Newcastle United U21 were later added to the group. In the second round, Lincoln were drawn at home against Morecambe. In the third round, Lincoln were drawn at home against either Mansfield Town or Everton U21. The quarter-final draw was made on 15 December and Lincoln were drawn to face Accrington Stanley.

Transfers

In

Out

Loans in

Loans out

Contracts

Squad statistics

Appearances 

|-
|colspan="12" style="text-align:center;" |Away on loan

|-
|colspan="12" style="text-align:center;" |No longer at the club

|}

Goalscorers

Includes all competitive matches.

Disciplinary record

Clean sheets

Awards

Sky Bet League One Player of the Month

EFL Goal of the Month

EFL League Cup Player of the Round

References 

Lincoln Citu
Lincoln City F.C. seasons